Ete, Été or ETE may refer to:

People 
 Erik Zabel (born 1970), German cyclist known by the nickname "Ete"
 Eteuati Ete, New Zealand actor

Other uses 
 ETE (tokamak) at the National Institute for Space Research in Brazil
 Ete, Hungary
 National Bank of Greece, a commercial bank
Été, French word for Summer